Mongan is an Irish surname anglicised. It derives from the ancient and possibly pre-10th century Gaelic Ó Mongáin, 'descendant of Mongan', whose name comes from mongach, meaning long-haired.

Three branches of this clan lived in ancient Ireland. These were a sept in Ulster which gave its name to the parish of Termonomongan in County Tyrone; the second was originally based upon Counties Cork and Tipperary, whilst the third sept lay in North Connacht. Early recordings include Teag Managan, in the Hearth Tax rolls of 1665 for County Tipperary, and Patrick Mongan and Maria Flanagan, who were married at Kilbride in County Roscommon in 1845.

Notable people with the surname include:

 Agnes Mongan (1905–1996), American art historian
 Joseph Mongan (1880–1951), Irish politician
 John C. Mongan, American politician
 Charles Mongan Warburton (1754–1826), Anglican bishop